Kazakhstan competed at the 2012 Summer Paralympics in London, United Kingdom, from August 29 to September 9, 2012.

Athletics 

Men’s Track and Road Events

Men’s Field Events

Women’s Track and Road Events

Powerlifting 

Men

Women

Swimming

Men

Women

See also
 Kazakhstan at the 2012 Summer Olympics
 Kazakhstan at the Paralympics

References

Nations at the 2012 Summer Paralympics
2012
2012 in Kazakhstani sport